The Pocking Solar Park is a photovoltaic power station in Pocking, Lower Bavaria, Germany. It has installed capacity of 10 megawatts. Construction and assembly of the power plant begun in August 2005 and was completed in March 2006.

It has 57,912 modules.

See also

Energy policy of the European Union
Renewable energy commercialization
Renewable energy in Germany

References

Photovoltaic power stations in Germany
Passau (district)